Manuel Martínez Iñiguez (born 3 January 1972) is a Mexican retired football midfielder. He obtained a total number of four caps for the Mexico national team between 1995 and 2000, and was a squad member at 1995 Copa América. He made his debut on 1995-06-21 during the US Cup against Colombia.

A left-sided midfielder, Martinez played eight years for Chivas, and was a starter on the team that won the Verano 1997 championship.

References

1972 births
Living people
Mexican footballers
Mexico international footballers
Mexico youth international footballers
Mexico under-20 international footballers
Association football midfielders
1995 Copa América players
Footballers from Guadalajara, Jalisco
C.D. Guadalajara footballers
Deportivo Toluca F.C. players
Club León footballers
Querétaro F.C. footballers
Atlas F.C. footballers
Liga MX players